The Fletcher School of Law and Diplomacy is the graduate school of international affairs of Tufts University, in Medford, Massachusetts. The School is one of America's oldest graduate schools of international relations and is well-ranked in its masters and doctoral programs. As of 2017, the student body numbered around 230, of whom 36 percent were international students from 70 countries, and around a quarter were U.S. minorities. The school's alumni network numbers over 9,500 in 160 countries, and includes foreign heads of state, ambassadors, diplomats, foreign ministers, high-ranking military officers, heads of nonprofit organizations, and corporate executives.

History

The Fletcher School of Law and Diplomacy was founded in 1933 with the bequest of Austin Barclay Fletcher, who left over $3 million to Tufts University upon his death in 1923. A third of these funds were dedicated “for the establishment and maintenance of a School of Law and Diplomacy, to be known as The Fletcher School of Law or The Fletcher School of Law and Diplomacy." Fletcher envisioned "a school to prepare people for diplomatic service and to teach such matters as come within the scope of foreign relations [which] embraces within it as a fundamental and thorough knowledge of the principles of international law upon which diplomacy is founded, although the profession of a diplomat carries with it also a knowledge of many things of a geographic and economic nature which affect relations between nations."

The Fletcher School of Law and Diplomacy opened in 1933 under the joint administration of Harvard University and Tufts College. One of the first buildings acquired was Goddard Hall which was converted into a library. Tufts College assumed exclusive responsibility for the administration of The Fletcher School of Law and Diplomacy in 1935. Between 1963 and 1965, Mugar Hall was constructed and renovated in 2016 to serve the expanding needs of Fletcher.

Organization
On October 1, 2019, Rachel Kyte assumed the role of Dean of The Fletcher School of Law & Diplomacy, becoming the thirteenth dean of the school. Formerly the chief executive officer of Sustainable Energy for All (SEforALL) and special representative of the UN secretary-general for Sustainable Energy for All, Kyte previously was the World Bank Group vice president and special envoy for climate change. Rachel Kyte completed the hybrid residence/online Global Master of Arts Program (GMAP) and has been a professor of practice at the school since 2014. Prior deans of The Fletcher School of Law and Diplomacy have been ambassadors, senior military leaders including admirals, tenured professors, and career diplomats. Admiral James Stavridis, former NATO Supreme Allied Commander Europe, served as dean from 2013 to 2018. He had earlier received his MALD and PhD from the school. Ambassador Stephen Bosworth, dean from 2001 to 2013, was a career diplomat, a three-time U.S. ambassador, and a former director of policy planning for the U.S. Department of State. 

On its campus in Medford, Massachusetts, The Fletcher School of Law & Diplomacy offers multi-disciplinary instruction in international affairs through several master's degree programs and a Ph.D. program. Regardless of the degree program in which they are enrolled, students have the opportunity to select from among more than 170 courses across three divisions: International Law and Organization (ILO); Diplomacy, History and Politics (DHP); and Economics and International Business (EIB).

The Fletcher School of Law & Diplomacy employs more than 30 full-time tenured or tenure-track faculty as well as a variety of adjunct and visiting professors, and benefits from faculty at partner schools within Tufts, including the Friedman School of Nutrition Science and Policy. The full-time Fletcher faculty includes economists, international law theorists, historians, and political scientists who hold the academic ranks of professor, associate professor, assistant professor, and lecturer. With the exception of the current Dean, all faculty members hold terminal degrees in their respective fields (a Ph.D. in the case of historians, political scientists, and economists; and a J.D. in the case of lawyers). In 2013, the faculty to student ratio in Medford is 1:8.6.

Academics

The school has eleven degree programs: its flagship two-year Master of Arts in Law and Diplomacy (MALD); a one-year Master of Arts for mid-career professionals; a one-year, mid-career Master of Arts (via the Global Master of Arts Program) that combines online and residential learning; a Ph.D. program; a Master of International Business (MIB); a Master of Global Business Administration, an online program combining the study of business with international affairs; and a Master of Laws (LL.M.) in International Law. Additionally, there are several joint and dual degree and certificate programs.

The school has been a leader and innovator in hybrid education (online combines with residency).   Its master's degree for mid-career professionals through its Global Master of Arts Program (GMAP) is unique amongst international relations degrees. The year-long program combines three 2-week residencies (two at The Fletcher School and one at a different international location each year) with instruction covering topics such as negotiation, international business and economic law, international trade, economics and politics from a global perspective.

Programs of study

Master of Arts in Law and Diplomacy (MALD)
Master in Global Affairs (MGA)
Master of International Business (MIB)
Master of Laws (LL.M.) in International Law
Master of Arts in international relations, a 1-year residential program
Master of Arts in international relations, via the Global Master of Arts Program (GMAP), a 1-year hybrid residential/internet-mediated program
Master of Arts in Humanitarian Assistance, offered jointly with the Friedman School of Nutrition Science and Policy at Tufts University
Master of Arts in Transatlantic Affairs, offered jointly with the College of Europe
Master of Science in Cybersecurity and Public Policy, offered jointly with the School of Engineering at Tufts University
Master of Global Business Administration, a 16-24 month online degree program
Global Master of Arts Program (GMAP), a hybrid three 2-week residencies program for mid-senior career professionals
Doctor of Philosophy in International Relations
Doctor of Philosophy in Economics and Public Policy, offered jointly with the Tufts University Graduate School of Arts and Sciences

Research
Fletcher has a number of research centers and institutes, including:
The Center for International Environment and Resource Policy (CIERP) conducts interdisciplinary and policy-relevant research on pressing environmental issues.
The Edward R. Murrow Center of Public Diplomacy was established in memory of the journalist and former head of the United States Information Agency.
The Fares Center for Eastern Mediterranean Studies organizes public lectures, conferences, and roundtables to create a greater understanding of the region and its challenges. 
The Hitachi Center for Technology and International Affairs focuses on the management of innovation and technological change and the advancement of economic and financial integration. 
The Institute for Business in the Global Context (IBGC) conducts research and organizes interdisciplinary conferences on contemporary issues in international business. 
The Institute for Human Security promotes research and education at the intersection between humanitarianism, development, human rights, and conflict resolution. 
The International Security Studies Program (ISSP) is a distinct field of study within the multidisciplinary curriculum of The Fletcher School. 
The Russia and Eurasia Program is dedicated to teaching and research on a broad range of historical and contemporary issues related to Russia, Eastern Europe, Central Asia, and the Caucasus. 
The World Peace Foundation, provides intellectual leadership on issues of peace, justice, and security of foreign parties, and provides financial support only for projects that it has initiated itself.

Affiliated programs
The Center for South Asian and Indian Ocean Studies
The Global Development and Environmental Institute
Refugees and Forced Migration Program

Publications
The Fletcher Forum of World Affairs, a student-managed foreign policy journal, founded in 1975 and published biannually. 
Fletcher Security Review, an online and print journal focused on security studies.
PRAXIS: The Fletcher Journal of Human Security, produced in collaboration with Fletcher's Institute for Human Security.

Notable faculty

Bhaskar Chakravorti, Senior Associate Dean, International Business & Finance, Director, Institute for Business in the Global Context.
Antonia Chayes, Professor of International Politics and Law, former United States Under Secretary of the Air Force.
Alex de Waal, African development scholar, and director of the World Peace Foundation at the Fletcher School.
Daniel W. Drezner, Professor of International Politics, regular featured columnist in Foreign Policy and The Washington Post.
Nadim Rouhana, Professor of International Affairs and Conflict Studies, expert on the Israeli-Palestinian conflict, and Director of the Fares Center at the Fletcher School.
Leila Fawaz, Issam M. Fares Professor of Lebanese and Eastern Mediterranean Studies, Carnegie Scholar.
Michael J. Glennon, Professor of International Law, former legal counsel to Senate Foreign Relations Committee.
William Moomaw, Professor of International Environmental Policy, lead author of the Nobel Prize-winning Intergovernmental Panel on Climate Change, developed the concept of New diplomacy.
Richard H. Shultz, Professor of International Politics.
Ayesha Jalal, Professor of History and the Director of the Center for South Asian and Indian Ocean Studies, former MacArthur Fellow.
Sung-Yoon Lee, Kim Koo-Korea Foundation Assistant Professor of Korean Studies.
Klaus Scharioth, Professor of Practice, former German Ambassador to the US and State Secretary of the German Foreign Office.
Patrick Webb, Alexander McFarlane Professor of Nutrition, Policy and Evidence Adviser to the Global Panel on Agriculture and Food Systems for Nutrition, former Dean for Academic Affairs at the Friedman School of Nutrition Science and Policy at Tufts University, former Chief of Nutrition for the United Nations World Food Programme.
Ibrahim Warde, Professor of International Business.
Joyce Aluoch, Judge of the International Criminal Court in The Hague.
Dr. Shahid Masood, Pakistani TV Journalist, an anchorperson and a medical doctor.
James Stavridis, (Admiral, Retired), Commander of United States Southern Command, United States European Command, and was the first United States Navy Admiral to be appointed the NATO Supreme Allied Commander Europe, former Dean of the Fletcher School of Law and Diplomacy

Notable alumni
The Fletcher School has over 9,500 alumni living around the world in 140 countries, including hundreds of sitting ambassadors, award-winning journalists and authors, global business executives and leaders of international peacekeeping, humanitarian and security initiatives.

References

External links

Harvard University
Tufts University
Schools of international relations in the United States
Law schools in Massachusetts
Educational institutions established in 1933
Universities and colleges in Middlesex County, Massachusetts
Buildings and structures in Medford, Massachusetts
1933 establishments in Massachusetts